Arnel is the name of:

 Arnel Cerafica, Filipino politician
 Arnel Pineda (born 1967), Filipino singer and songwriter
 Arnel Jakupović (born 1998), Austrian footballer 
 Brent Arnel (born 1979), New Zealand 
 cricketer
 Arnel Bluffs, rock outcrops in Antarctica

A Kenyan dodo